Kraft (Norwegian for Power) is the first album by the Norwegian black metal band Vreid.

Track listing
"Wrath of Mine" – 4:17
"Raped by Light" – 3:50
"Helvete" ("Hell") – 5:33
"Unholy Water" – 4:36
"Eldast, Utan Å Gro" ("Aging, Without Growing") – 6:54
"Evig Pine" ("Eternal Pain") – 4:54
"Empty" – 4:05
"Songen Åt Fangen" ("The Song to the Prisoner") – 6:01

Credits
Hvàll - bass
Sture - vocals and guitar
Ese - guitar
Steingrim - drums

References

Vreid albums
2004 debut albums